Oak Ridges may refer to:

Places
 Oak Ridges (electoral district), a defunct electoral district in Ontario
 Oak Ridges, Ontario, a community within the boundaries of Richmond Hill, Ontario, Canada
 Oak Ridges Dynes, a defunct ice hockey team from the community of Oak Ridges
 Oak Ridges Moraine
 Oak Ridges—Markham, an electoral district in Ontario

Other uses
 Oak Ridges Moraine Conservation Act (officially known as the Oak Ridges Moraine Conservation Act, 2001), a conservation plan for land situated on or near the Oak Ridges Moraine in Ontario
 Oak Ridges Moraine Land Trust

See also
 Oak Ridge (disambiguation)